Bluff Creek may refer to:

Bluff Creek, Indiana, an unincorporated community
Bluff Creek, Louisiana, an unincorporated community
Bluff Creek (California), a watercourse in California that empties into Ballona Wetlands
Bluff Creek (Des Moines River tributary), a stream in Iowa
Bluff Creek (Cimarron River tributary), a stream in Kansas

See also
Bluff Creek Formation